This is the progression of world record improvements of the high jump of Masters athletics.

Key

IAAF includes indoor marks in the record list since 2000, but WMA does not follow that practice.

Women 35

Women 40

Women 45

Women 50

Women 55

Women 60

Women 65

Women 70

Women 75

Women 80

Women 85

Women 90

Women 95

References

Masters Athletics High Jump list

External links
 World Masters Rankings up to 2012
 World Masters Athletic Rankings from 2013
 Absolute Age Records Open Class
 Absolute Age Records
 Actual Masters World Records (outdoor)
 Actual Masters World Records (indoor)

Masters athletics world record progressions
High jump